The 2002 European Promotion Cup for Men was the 8th edition of this tournament. It was hosted in Ta'Qali, Malta and San Marino achieved its first title ever after beating Wales in the final game.

Preliminary round

Group A

Group B

Classification games

Final round

Bracket

Final

Final ranking

External links
FIBA Archive

2002
Small Countries
International basketball competitions hosted by Malta
2002 in Maltese sport